The Society of Saint Pius X has close links with several religious institutes, chiefly in France.

The Holy See extended, on 20 November 2016, permanent canonical recognition to confessions heard by Society priests (Misericordia et Misera, 12) and later, on 4 April 2017, also allowed local ordinaries to grant delegation to priests of the Society for officially witnessing marriages.

Closely linked orders 
Brothers of the Priestly Fraternity of Saint Pius X
Sisters of the Priestly Fraternity of Saint Pius X
Oblates of the Priestly Fraternity of Saint Pius X
Missionary Sisters of Jesus and Mary

Latin orders

Male orders 
The following are associated male orders:
Capuchins-inspired Capucins de Morgon
Dominican-inspired Les Frères de Notre-Dame-du-Rosaire
Fraternity of the Transfiguration
Parish Cooperators of Christ the King, in Caussade, France

Female orders 
The following are associated female orders:

Contemplative dominican sisters:  in Montagnac, France: Dominicaines contemplatives de Montagnac
Contemplative dominican sisters in Avrillé, France: Dominicaines contemplatives d’Avrillé
Franciscan sisters: Les Petites Sœurs de saint François – Le Trévoux
Sisters of Transfiguration
Baptistines: Les petites sœurs de saint Jean-Baptiste – Le Rafflay
Teaching dominican sisters: Dominicaines enseignantes du saint Nom de Jésus et du Cœur Immaculée de Marie – Brignoles
Teaching dominican sisters: Dominicaines enseignantes du Saint Nom de Jésus – Fanjeaux
Carmelites: Carmel du Cœur Immaculé de Marie, Eynesse
Benedictines: Bénédictines de Perdechat
Poor Clares: Clarisses de Morgon
Benedictines in New Mexico
Bethany Sisters in Killiney Road, Singapore
Disciples of the Cenacle in Velletri, Italy
Consoling Sisters of the Sacred Heart of Jesus in Vigne de Narni, Italy
Dominican Teaching Sisters of the Holy Name of Jesus in Fanjeaux, France with schools
Dominican Teaching Sisters in Wanganui, New Zealand
Madres Mínimas Franciscanas del Perpetuo Socorro de María (Franciscan Minims of the Perpetual Help of Mary) in Mexico City, Mexico
Franciscan Sisters of Christ the King in Kansas City, U.S.

Eastern orders 
The following are associated religious orders that celebrate according to Eastern Catholic liturgies:
Priestly Fraternity of Saint Josaphat at Lviv, Ukraine
Fraternity of Saint John the Baptist at Riga, Latvia
Greek Catholic Sisters of the Studite Order at Riga, Latvia
Ukrainian Basilian Sisters at Lviv, Ukraine

References 

Society of Saint Pius X